Progress Telerik Test Studio is a Windows-based software test automation tool for web and desktop that supports functional testing, software performance testing, load testing  and RESTful API testing developed by Telerik. The tool ships with a plugin for Visual Studio and a standalone app that use the same repositories and file formats. Test Studio supports HTML, AJAX, Silverlight, ASP.NET MVC, JavaScript, WPF, Angular, React, ASP.NET AJAX, ASP.NET Core, and Blazor. Any application that runs on .NET 5, .NET Core, .NET 6 or higher can be automated with Test Studio. Test Studio supports cross-browser testing for Internet Explorer, Firefox, Microsoft Edge, and Chrome.

Product
Test Studio's standalone IDE comes with an integrated visual record and playback test recorder that allows users to create test steps based on mouse-click interaction with the UI elements in the browser. Automated test cases can be further enhanced through going into the test script and performing advanced in-code actions. The Visual Studio extension allows users to use Test Studio's automation features within Microsoft Visual Studio.
Functional Testing
 The tool provides test automation support for web and desktop applications - Silverlight, WPF, AJAX, HTML, WPF, and MVC, JavaScript calls, dynamic page synchronization, client-side behaviors, as well as support for Visual Studio 2010 and 2012.

RESTful API Testing
 Test Studio's API testing allows testing REST protocols. Test Studio supports the creation of verifications against all common API requests based on point and click.

Load Testing Existing Test Studio functional tests or Fiddler logs can be used to create load tests. Test Studio's load agents are making use of multi-core, hyper threaded CPUs in order to generate a high user load.

Responsive Web Testing Test Studio supports testing of responsive web applications to check the UI under test against different form factors.

Features in Brief 
Some of Test Studio's features include:
 Scriptless test recording and playback
 Cross-browser  test execution – Internet Explorer, Firefox, Chrome and Microsoft Edge
 Support for HTML, AJAX, Silverlight, WPF and ASP.NET MVC application testing
 Element abstraction and reuse
 Hybrid element location combining DOM-based attributes and images
 Customizable test results and reports
 Integration with Visual Studio 2010 / 2012, MS Team Foundation Server
 Nunit, MbUnit, XUnit integration
 Sentence-based UI validation
 Continuous integration with Microsoft Build Server, CruiseControl and TeamCity
 Visual Debugger
 Test customization in C# and VB.NET
 Exploratory Testing
 Manual Testing
 Integration with HP Quality Center
 Built-in testing framework
 DOM Explorer
 Fiddler web debugger integration
 Automated data-driven testing
 Bug-tracking tools integration

See also 
 Test automation
 GUI software testing
 List of GUI testing tools
 List of web testing tools

References

External links 
 Official Telerik Test Studio website
 Test Studio on Visual Studio Gallery
 Test Studio Review on Visual Studio Magazine

Software testing tools
Graphical user interface testing
Automation software
Load testing tools